Norfolk station may refer to:

Norfolk station (Amtrak), an Amtrak station in Norfolk, Virginia
Norfolk station (MBTA), an MBTA station in Norfolk, Massachusetts 
Norfolk Terminal Station, a former train station in Norfolk, Virginia
Lambert's Point#station, a former train station in Norfolk, Virginia

See also
Naval Station Norfolk